The 2001 Cincinnati Bearcats football team represented the University of Cincinnati in the 2001 NCAA Division I-A football season. The team, coached by Rick Minter, played its home games in Nippert Stadium, as it has since 1924.

Schedule

Players in the 2002 NFL Draft

References

Cincinnati
Cincinnati Bearcats football seasons
Cincinnati Bearcats football